Ya'akov Frank (12 March 1913 – 10 July 1993) was an Israeli politician who served as a member of the Knesset for the Alignment between 1975 and 1977.

Biography
Born in Jerusalem during the Ottoman era, Frank received a high school education. He later served as chairman of the Association of Craftsmen.

He was on the Alignment list for the 1973 Knesset elections, but failed to win a seat. However, he entered the Knesset on 12 August 1975 as a replacement for the deceased Pinchas Sapir. He sat on the Economic Affairs Committee and the State Control Committee, before losing his seat in the 1977 elections.

He died in 1993 at the age of 80.

References

External links
 

1913 births
1993 deaths
People from Jerusalem
Alignment (Israel) politicians
Jews in Ottoman Palestine
Jews in Mandatory Palestine
Members of the 8th Knesset (1974–1977)